Kulegh Kalam (also Romanized as Kūlegh Kalam; also known as Kūlekhkalam) is a village in Band-e Zarak Rural District, in the Central District of Minab County, Hormozgan Province, Iran. At the 2006 census, its population was 344, in 51 families.

References 

Populated places in Minab County